Adelaide Day Rollston (Kidd; February 23, 1854 – January 7, 1941) was an American poet and author.

Early life and education
Adelaide Day Kidd was born near Paducah, Kentucky, February 23, 1854. Her earliest years were spent in the countryside. Her parents were, William Henry Kidd (1819-1864), a physician of good standing, and Elvira (Roberts) Kidd (1823-1895). Her siblings were, Sarah, Mary Marcellus, Cincinnatus, Eliza, Fannie, Edmonia, William, and John.

At the age of twelve, her talent for writing verse began to manifest itself in brief poems published in the local press. Later, several appeared in the Saturday Star-Journal, of New York City. She was educated in St Mary's Academy, in Paducah, to which city her parents had removed when she was twelve years old.

Career
After completing her education, Rollston continued her contributions to the neighboring press, and frequently verses over her name appeared in The Courier-Journal of Louisville, Kentucky. They attracted little or no attention, until she found a friend and helper in the veteran of the Kentucky press, Col. H. M. McCarty, who blamed when necessary and gave praise when praise was due. Still, her writing career was a struggle. In 1877, she began to contribute to the Current, and since then, she received wide recognition as a contributor to Once a Week, Youth's Companion, Godey's Lady's Book, and other eastern periodicals. She also wrote several novelettes. Her poems included, "His Second Wife", "One Woman's Story", "A Fragment", "If I Had Known", and "The Wanderers".

Death
On December 1874, in Massac County, Illinois, she married Joseph L. Rollston (1850–1931). They had four children, Guy, Vera, Ina, and Edward.

Adelaide Day Rollston died at her home in Paducah, Kentucky January 7, 1941. Burial was in the city's Oak Grove Cemetery.

References

External links
 

1854 births
1941 deaths
Wikipedia articles incorporating text from A Woman of the Century
People from Paducah, Kentucky
Writers from Kentucky
19th-century American poets
19th-century American women writers
American women poets
19th-century American novelists
American women novelists